Ellsworth Milton (E. M.) Statler (October 26, 1863 – April 16, 1928) was an American hotel businessman, founder of the Statler Hotels chain, born in Somerset County, Pennsylvania.

Biography
Statler built his first permanent hotel in 1907, in Buffalo, New York (it being the first major hotel to have a private bath or shower and running water in every room). Future Statler Hotels constructed by E. M. Statler were located in Cleveland (1912), Detroit (1915), St. Louis (1917), New York (the Hotel Pennsylvania, built by the Pennsylvania Railroad and leased to Statler and Franklin J. Matchette in 1919; later bought by the Hotels Statler Company in 1948), a new hotel in Buffalo (1923; the previous Hotel Statler in Buffalo was renamed the Hotel Buffalo and sold later in the 1920s), and his last hotel, the Boston Park Plaza built in Boston (1927).

The Hotels Statler Company built several other hotels after Statler's death in 1928. The Statler Hotel chain was sold to Hilton Hotels in 1954.

Upon his death, the Statler Foundation was established in his will, becoming benefactors of what is now the Cornell University School of Hotel Administration in Ithaca, New York. The Statler Foundation, located in Buffalo, New York, continues to contribute to many worthwhile hospitality-related causes.

On March 20, 1951, the radio show, Cavalcade of America sponsored by DuPont, featured the life story of Ellsworth Statler in a light 30 minute drama.

In 1984, E. M. Statler (as he preferred to be called) was inducted into the Wheeling, West Virginia Hall of Fame.  He was also inducted into the Hospitality Industry Hall of Honor in 1997 along with Curt Carlson, Charles Forte, Baron Forte, and Ray Kroc.

Personal life
Ellsworth  Statler was the third of the children of Rev. William J. Statler and Mary A. McKinney (Govinda R., Charles O., Ellsworth M., Elizabeth, Alabama A., Lillian, Osceola A., and  William J.).

E.M. married first Mary Idesta Manderbach (1866 – 28 October 1925) and together they raised four adopted children. Milton Howland Statler (16 September 1906 – 7 December 1933), Marian Francis Statler (3 July 1907 – 7 August 1927), Ellsw Morgan Statler (d. 1987), and Elva Idesta Statler (7 June 1912 – 27 February 1935). E.M. had only one grandchild, Milton's daughter Joan M. Statler (1931–2005).

E.M. married Alice M. Seidler (d. 1969) on 30 April 1927.

Death
E.M. Statler died of double pneumonia at 6:05 o'clock in the morning April 16, 1928 at the Hotel Pennsylvania, where he lived. He was 64 years old.

See also
Howard B. Meek
Statler Hotels

Notes 
 Jarman, Rufus (1952) A Bed for the Night
 Miller, Floyd (1969) Statler

References

External links 
  History of the Cornell University School of Hotel Administration
  A Tale of a (Hotel) Library Catalog
 Conrad N. Hilton College of Hotel and Restaurant Management Hall of Honor
 E.M. Statler: The Father of the American Hotel
 Statler in Buffalo: Restaurant
 Statler in Buffalo: Pan-American Hotel
 Statler in Buffalo: His First Hotel
 Statler in Buffalo: His Favorite Hotel
 Statler in Buffalo: His Estate

1863 births
1928 deaths
People from Gettysburg, Pennsylvania
Businesspeople from Buffalo, New York
American hoteliers
Businesspeople from West Virginia
Burials at Kensico Cemetery
Businesspeople from Pennsylvania